Diablo IV  is an upcoming action role-playing game developed and published by Blizzard Entertainment, and is the fourth main installment in the Diablo series. The game was announced on November 1, 2019 at BlizzCon 2019, and is scheduled for release on June 6, 2023. A playable beta was released on March 17, 2023, and an open beta is scheduled for release on March 24, 2023.  Series features such as re-playable, procedurally generated dungeons, and loot-focused character-building will return, while new features such as an open world, and player versus player (PVP) interactions will be incorporated. Five playable classes have been announced—Barbarian, Sorceress, Druid, Rogue, and Necromancer—all of which have appeared previously in the series. Players guide their character through quests and combat in the world of Sanctuary as the once banished Lilith returns to wreak havoc.

Gameplay

The core formula for the series' gameplay revolves around gradually obtaining stronger equipment by defeating increasingly difficult enemies. Enemies are fought using different character class skills which can be customized by equipment and talent trees. This concept is used to progress through the story and quests. Enemies are split into monster families which are defined by a theme, combat style, and their location. Each family contains different archetypes that hold different roles allowing for synergies of specialty abilities between family members. To differentiate between them, they have unique silhouettes, stances and weapons.

Creative director Sebastian Stepien explained that the goal was to create a more "grounded" story than Diablo III. In order to achieve this, the plot revolves around the simple folk of Sanctuary rather than "politics, kings, or another high-fantasy theme."

The playable character's effectiveness in combat is determined by their attributes and their boosts from equipped items. Offensive attributes include attack and critical chance which increase damage output. Defensive stats include elemental resistance and defense which increase how much damage can be taken. Diablo IV introduces three new attributes: Angelic, Demonic, and Ancestral Power. Angelic and Demonic Power alter the duration of beneficial and negative effects respectively. Ancestral Power increases the chance of effects being applied to another entity. Weapons and gear have increasing rarity which are a general indicator of their power. The rarest items have unique effects that alter more than just the character's parameters. Gear can be further customised with runes and runewords. These items allow players to upgrade selected items with additional effects. They are split into two groups: condition runes, and effect runes. Effect runes describe the additional effects. Conditions runes describe the situations under which the effect runes will be active. These two items combine to form a runeword that then can be applied to an item. In an interview with lead game designer Joe Shely and senior producer Tiffany Wat, it was revealed that trading and crafting will be available in the game but will be limited to resources outside of the most powerful items. Limited-time seasons return to the game, which alter legendary powers to shift the meta-game.

Microtransactions are included in the form of cosmetic items. The game cannot be played offline and will require an internet connection.

Character classes

Five classes have been announced. The Barbarian, Sorceress, and Druid classes were announced at BlizzCon 2019, while a fourth, the Rogue class, was announced at BlizzCon 2021. The fifth class, the Necromancer, was announced in 2022.

 The Barbarian, which appears in Diablo II and Diablo III, has the ability to switch between weapons while in combat. 
 The Sorceress, returning from the first game and Diablo II, is an elemental mage-type character wielding fire, cold, and lightning magics.
 The Druid, returning from Diablo II, can shapeshift between human, werewolf, and werebear forms, and possesses earthen and storm magics.
 The Rogue, returning from the first game, is a quick-moving combatant that alternates between bladed melee or ranged combat with a bow.
 The Necromancer, returning from Diablo II and Diablo III, utilizes dark magic for summoning and attacks.

Character appearance is customizable rather than being tied to a class. These include choosing a character portrait and the skin color of their character. Mount appearances can be customized. Skill trees exist, allowing for ability customization.

Environment

Players will be able to traverse through five regions within the Diablo series world of Sanctuary: Scosglen, Fractured Peaks, Dry Steppes, Hawezar, and Kehjistan. Hell will also be a playable area. Procedurally generated dungeons are included, and consist of random layouts of interior and exterior environments. Dungeons are separately instanced, therefore non-party players will not appear. Sanctuary is a fixed area, therefore it will not have the procedurally-generated maps seen in the game's dungeon. Scosglen is a forested coastal area home to druids, werewolves, and drowned-type enemies. Fractured Peaks is a snowy mountainous area containing deep cave systems. Dry Steppes resides in a desert that proves to be so harsh that the inhabitants have turned to cannibalism. Hawezar is home to witches, and has a swamp-type setting. Finally, Kehjistan is a war-ravaged wasteland containing the ruins of a once-prosperous civilization.

The game world is an open world setting; travelling between different regions or dungeons has no loading screens. Additionally, each region can be completed in any order as decided by the player. In order to support these new changes, enemies are scaled to the player (or the party leader in multiplayer) and the story is non-linear. Hardcore mode is present in the game. Select areas within each region have player interactions restricted until sufficient milestones in the story are reached, and such progress will be synced to that of the party leader. Over-world areas have non-party player interactions such as PVP, and boss events that passing players can join. Player population in the world will shift depending on the area. Large settlements will display large populations, and to enforce a sense of desolation, more wild zones will change the number of players shown to others.

When questioned about Diablo IVs atmosphere, ex-game director Luis Barriga stated: "We want users to feel like they're in a medieval city." For the first time in the series all assets are standard 3D game assets and terrain has elevation, allowing for in-game cinematics, and environment interaction.

Plot
Set in the Diablo series' world of Sanctuary, Diablo IV takes place following the aftermath of Diablo III: Reaper of Souls. Cultists have summoned the main antagonist and daughter of Mephisto, Lilith. After the events of previous games, the forces of demons and angels have been depleted, allowing an opening for her to establish power in Sanctuary.

Prior to the game's events, Lilith and the angel Inarius created the realm of Sanctuary to provide refuge for those who wished to escape the eternal conflict between the High Heavens and the Burning Hells. This demon-angel relationship led to the birth of the Nephalem, a race that the protagonist falls under; neither Angel nor Demon, but a distinct combination of both. Those in Sanctuary believed that this power would bring attention to their shelter and, as a result, the inhabitants spoke of destroying them. Lilith, not wanting her children to be killed, destroyed any that opposed her, causing Inarius to banish her to the void.

Development 
Diablo IV was announced on November 1, 2019 at Blizzcon 2019, and is planned to be released for PlayStation 4, PlayStation 5, Windows, Xbox One, and Xbox Series X/S. Development of the PC and console builds is happening simultaneously. Diablo IVs game director was Luis Barriga, who worked on Diablo III: Reaper of Souls, and World of Warcraft: Legion.

Game designer Jesse McCree stated that the aesthetic of the game was inspired by that of heavy metal. Their artistic direction tried to achieve an aesthetic between that of the second and third game in the series, with the darkness of Diablo II and the hand-painted feel of Diablo III and medieval fine art.

The development team drew on past editions of Diablo to design characters. For example, the Rogue was intended to capture the high dexterity gameplay of the second game's Assassin and the third game's Demon Hunter.

As of July 2021, Barriga and McCree were no longer employed at Blizzard following the California Department of Fair Employment and Housing v. Activision Blizzard lawsuit.

Following the departure of interim co-lead Jen Oneal, Blizzard announced that Diablo IV would not be released in 2022, citing high employee turnover. Blizzard further announced that the game would be monetized by selling cosmetic items and its season pass, as opposed to selling item upgrades like in Diablo Immortal. On June 12, 2022, a 2023 release was announced. During The Game Awards 2022 event, Blizzard announced that the game would release on June 6.

Marketing
Before the announcement, there was evidence for an imminent announcement in a description for a Diablo artbook. In celebration of the Diablo IV announcement, Blizzcon 2019 virtual ticket holders received a set of in-game cosmetic wings based on the wings of Lilith.

The game was promoted at The Game Awards 2022 with a new trailer and a performance of "Lilith" by singer Halsey.

Notes

References

External links
 Official website

Upcoming video games scheduled for 2023
Blizzard games
Diablo (series) video games
PlayStation 4 games
PlayStation 5 games
Windows games
Xbox One games
Xbox Series X and Series S games
Multiplayer video games
Action role-playing video games
Video games developed in the United States
Video games about demons
Video game sequels